Girl On The Run is a 1953 ultra-low budget independent production, the plot of which drops a standard crime melodrama into the noirish, tawdry world of a carnival burlesque show. According to filmographer Michael Pitts, "Released by Astor Pictures late in 1953, Girl on the Run was filmed as The Hidden Woman. A Rose Tree Production, it opens and closes with scenes of a hysterically laughing mechanical clown and all its action takes place during one night at a tatty carnival."

The most notable cast member of Girl On The Run has one of the smallest roles: Steve McQueen, seen in the background of two scenes during his first known film role.  It also loosely inspired the hit 1971 Indian film Caravan, directed by Nasir Hussain and starring Asha Parekh.

Plot
Newspaper reporter Bill Martin is assigned to investigate a crime ring working out of a carnival. Martin's boss is killed and Martin is framed for the murder, while the victim's girlfriend Janet goes undercover as a burlesque dancer for Lil's carny revue while running from the gangster behind the scheme.

Cast
 Richard Coogan as Bill Martin
 Rosemary Pettit as Janet
 Frank Albertson as Hank
 Harry Bannister as Clay Reeves
 Edith King as Lil
 Charles Bolender as Blake

Production
Arthur J. Berkhard, co-writer and co-director of this film, had a background in theatre, having staged 14 Broadway productions beginning with the hit play Another Language, written by Rose Franken, in 1932. Girl on the Run would be his only film directorial credit.

References

External links

http://www.allmovie.com/movie/girl-on-the-run-v132363
http://www.afi.com/members/catalog/DetailView.aspx?s=&Movie=51121

1953 films
American crime drama films
1953 crime drama films
Astor Pictures films
American black-and-white films
1950s English-language films
1950s American films